William Albert Norris (August 30, 1927 – January 21, 2017) was a United States circuit judge of the United States Court of Appeals for the Ninth Circuit.

Norris was nominated by President Jimmy Carter on February 27, 1980, to a seat vacated by Walter Raleigh Ely, Jr. He was confirmed by the United States Senate on June 18, 1980, and received commission the same day. Assumed senior status on July 7, 1994. Norris's service was terminated on October 24, 1997, due to retirement.

Education and career

Born in Turtle Creek, Pennsylvania, Norris served in the United States Navy from 1945 to 1947. He received a Bachelor of Arts degree from Princeton University in 1951. He received a Juris Doctor from Stanford Law School in 1954. He was in private practice in Washington, D.C. from 1954 to 1955. He served as a law clerk for Justice William O. Douglas of the Supreme Court of the United States from 1955 to 1956. He returned to private practice in Los Angeles, California, from 1956 to 1980.

Federal judicial service

Norris was nominated by President Jimmy Carter on February 27, 1980, to a seat on the United States Court of Appeals for the Ninth Circuit vacated by Judge Walter Raleigh Ely Jr. He was confirmed by the United States Senate on June 18, 1980, and received his commission on June 18, 1980. He assumed senior status on July 7, 1994. His service terminated on October 24, 1997, due to retirement.

Notable case

Norris was known for his 1989 concurring opinion in Watkins v. U.S. Army, a case challenging the Army's policy of refusing to allow openly gay members. Judge Norris' view in that case, that sexual orientation is a suspect classification deserving of heightened scrutiny under the Constitution's Equal Protection clause, did not carry the day, but it has proven influential in many state court and lower federal court opinions striking down bans on gay marriage in the 2000s and 2010s.

Death

Norris died on January 21, 2017, at his home in Bel Air, Los Angeles, California.

See also 
List of law clerks of the Supreme Court of the United States (Seat 4)

References

External links 

1927 births
2017 deaths
People from Turtle Creek, Pennsylvania
Judges of the United States Court of Appeals for the Ninth Circuit
Law clerks of the Supreme Court of the United States
United States court of appeals judges appointed by Jimmy Carter
20th-century American judges
Princeton University alumni
Stanford Law School alumni